Winsford and Over railway station was one of three railway stations serving the town of Winsford in Cheshire. The station was the terminus of the Winsford and Over branch operated by the Cheshire Lines Committee and later British Railways.

History
Originally opening on 1 July 1870, it closed to passengers on 1 January 1874. It reopened on 1 May 1886, but closed to passengers for the second time on 1 December 1888. Following reopening on 1 February 1892, it remained open until final closure to passengers on 1 January 1931.

The station's passenger facilities were fairly basic. The station building was a wooden structure, originally the first station building at Northwich railway station

Notes

References

Further reading
 – 1952 photo of station

External links
Winsford & Over station on the Subterranea Britannica Disused Stations website
Winsford and Over Station on navigable 1949 O.S. map – the white disc near the "D" of "WINSFORD"

Disused railway stations in Cheshire
Former Cheshire Lines Committee stations
Railway stations in Great Britain opened in 1870
Railway stations in Great Britain closed in 1874
Railway stations in Great Britain opened in 1886
Railway stations in Great Britain closed in 1888
Railway stations in Great Britain opened in 1892
Railway stations in Great Britain closed in 1931
Winsford